Fort Arbuckle was constructed by the US Army in 1850 to counter raids by Plains Indian tribes on immigrant trains heading west to California and on the settlements of Choctaw and Chickasaw nations in Indian Territory.

Captain Randolph B. Marcy was assigned to select the site and oversee construction of the fort, named to honor the recently deceased General Matthew Arbuckle.

Marcy and his men constructed a rectangular fort, with barracks on opposite sides and the quartermaster and commissary facilities at opposite ends. Eventually the fort consisted of thirty buildings constructed of hewn logs, with stone chimneys.

Major William H. Emory of the First Cavalry was appointed commander of both Fort Arbuckle and Fort Washita in 1858. He found the facilities at the fort inadequate. Many of the buildings were in a poor state of repair; ordnance stores were depleted; and surplus ammunition and gunpowder had to be buried in order to be weather protected. But before the troops could remedy these faults, they received orders to build another fort, this one named Fort Cobb.

On May 3, 1861, after the Civil War broke out, Major Emory ordered the three forts under his command to be evacuated, with the troops going to Fort Leavenworth in Kansas, which supported the Union. The government of the Chickasaw Nation had already decided to support the Confederacy. Although Fort Arbuckle was briefly occupied by Confederate troops, no battle occurred in the vicinity, and it played no part in the war. After the war, the post was garrisoned by troops from the Sixth Infantry and Tenth Cavalry. The United States began to undertake campaigns against the Plains Indians west of here.

In 1868 General Philip Sheridan planned to use Fort Arbuckle as a supply depot for his campaigns against the Comanche. By the following spring, a great store of hay and grain had been brought by the river to Fort Gibson and then by wagon to Fort Arbuckle.  Sheridan sent many of his horses to the fort to be fed. Four companies of the Tenth Cavalry came to Fort Arbuckle for this purpose.

Fort Arbuckle was strategically obsolete by 1869, when Fort Sill was constructed farther west. Most of the Arbuckle garrison were sent there, after their horses had consumed the remaining supplies. The post was permanently abandoned in 1870. A single stone chimney is one of the only relics remaining of the old fort.

See also
Fort Cobb
Fort Sill
Fort Washita

References

External links
 

Buildings and structures in Garvin County, Oklahoma
Arbuckle
1850 establishments in Indian Territory
1870 disestablishments in the United States
Indian Territory
Pre-statehood history of Oklahoma
Arbuckle
National Register of Historic Places in Garvin County, Oklahoma